Charles Albert Buswell (October 15, 1913 – June 14, 2008) was an American prelate of the Roman Catholic Church who served as bishop of the Diocese of Pueblo in Colorado from 1959 to 1979.

Biography

Early life 
Charles Buswell was born on October 15, 1913, in Homestead, Oklahoma, to Charles and Bridget Buswell. Soon after his birth, the family moved to Oklahoma City. Charles Buswell received his primary and secondary education at the cathedral's St. Joseph School, the studied for two years at St. Benedict's College in Atchison, Kansas.  In 1933, he entered St. Louis Preparatory Seminary in Webster Groves, Missouri.

After studying theology at Kenrick-Glennon Seminary in St. Louis, Buswell entered in 1936 the American College of the Immaculate Conception in Leuven, Belgium.  He was known there as "both a serious student and a congenial companion among his fellow seminarians." He also served as prefect and assistant editor of The American College Bulletin during his studies.

Priesthood 
Buswell was ordained to the priesthood by Bishop Paulin Ladeuze in Belgium for the Diocese of Oklahoma City-Tulsa on July 9, 1939.  After returning to Oklahoma, he was named assistant pastor of a parish in Tonkawa, Oklahoma, and of Our Lady of Perpetual Help Cathedral Parish in Oklahoma City. Buswell, after being made diocesan vice-chancellor, became the first pastor of Christ the King Parish in 1947. At Christ the King, he placed emphasis on the greater involvement of the laity. He was raised to the rank of a privy chamberlain of his holiness in 1949, and a domestic prelate of his holiness in 1955.

Bishop of Pueblo 
On August 8, 1959, Buswell was appointed as the second bishop of the Diocese of Pueblo by Pope John XXIII. He was consecrated on  September 30, 1959, by Bishop Victor Reed, with Bishop s Stephen Leven and Glennon Flavin serving as co-consecrators. 

Buswell attended the Second Vatican Council from 1962 to 1965, and later described the council's mission as making the Church "a dynamic organism to penetrate the world with a spirit of truth and light" and not "a static remnant of past glory". He also spoke of opening the Church's windows "to let in fresh air and bring in a new vision that prepares the world for new responsibility for the world in which we live." Following the introduction of the Mass in English, Buswell criticized the wording of the Gloria.

In 1973, the Vatican ordered that the practice of separating a child's first Communion from first confession, for psychological purposes, be stopped. Buswell responded by saying, "I am convinced that the reception of first Communion before first confession is based on good theology, is rooted in solid findings of the behavioral sciences, and is excellent pastoral practice". He promised to continue the practice until the Vatican's decree received the "mature consideration" of American bishops and educators. During a Sunday parish visit in 1976, he introduced himself to a five-year-old girl at a mass as "Charlie". Following the end of the Mass, the little girl told him, "Nice show, Charlie!".

Retirement and legacy 
Pope Paul II accepted Buswell's resignation as bishop of the Diocese of Pueblo on September 19, 1979. In 1982, Catholics Act for ERA announced that Buswell had expressed his support for the proposed Equal Rights Amendment.  The amendment failed ratification.

A frequent visitor to American College in Leuven, Buswell served as "pastor in residence" there from 1985 to 1986. For the 150th anniversary of the foundation of the college in 2006, he was awarded the DeBecker Medal. Although unable to attend the ceremony, he was presented with the medal in the following December.

Charles Buswell died on June 14, 2008, at age 94.

References

External links
Catholic-Hierarchy
American College of the Immaculate Conception

1913 births
2008 deaths
Participants in the Second Vatican Council
Catholic University of Leuven (1834–1968) alumni
Kenrick–Glennon Seminary alumni
American College of the Immaculate Conception alumni
Roman Catholic bishops of Pueblo
20th-century Roman Catholic bishops in the United States
Clergy from Oklahoma City